Josie Loren Lopez (born March 19, 1987) is an American attorney and former actress, best known for the role of Kaylie Cruz in the ABC Family series Make It or Break It, and as FBI Agent Michelle Vega in the TV series The Mentalist.

Personal life
Josie was born in Miami, Florida, and is of Cuban descent. Her mother is Mercy Lopez, a middle school teacher at Zelda Glazer Middle School in Miami, Florida. She has one older sister and two brothers. Her older brother, Javier Lopez, is a Harvard University graduate and a commercial litigator in Miami. In 2010, she was voted one of the 50 Sexiest Singles by OK! magazine.

She attended high school at New World School of the Arts in Miami where she studied stage acting. Before becoming an actress, she cheered for an all-star cheerleading team in Miami called Top Gun All Stars. She studied mass media communication, minoring in Spanish, at UCLA.

On May 28, 2018, Loren married former NFL player Matt Leinart. They have two sons: Cayson Asis Leinart, born in January 2020 and Cannon Asis Leinart, born on May 24, 2021.

On May 19, 2019, Loren graduated from LMU Law School.

Career
Josie Loren played the character Holly on Hannah Montana, working with the teen sensation Miley Cyrus on the episode “People Who Use People”. Determined to make it big in show business, Loren then took on a role in Medium and later appeared on two episodes of the Nickelodeon series Drake & Josh as Maria. In 2007, Loren was cast on the Disney series Cory in the House, playing the character Jessica in the episode “Get Smarter".

Her next project was The Bill Engvall Show, which led her to be chosen for a role in the short comedy Hardly Married, written and directed by Diego Nunez. She followed it up with Christmas in Paradise, and then with 2008’s comic drama This Is Not a Test. She starred alongside Hill Harper, Robinne Lee, and Tom Arnold. Loren then obtained further popularity with a role in the hit film, 17 Again. The big screen comedy was directed by Burr Steers, and starred Zac Efron, Matthew Perry, and Michelle Trachtenberg. In 2009, Loren was cast in the Disney TV movie Hatching Pete. Later that year, she appeared in a starring role on the ABC Family series Make It or Break It, a program which follows the adventures of a group of gymnasts hoping to make it to the Olympics.

In July 2014, Loren was cast as a series regular in the seventh and final season of the crime drama series The Mentalist as rookie FBI agent Michelle Vega.

Filmography

References

External links
 
 

1987 births
21st-century American actresses
Actresses from Miami
American film actresses
American television actresses
Living people
University of California, Los Angeles alumni
American entertainers of Cuban descent
21st-century American lawyers
Loyola Law School alumni